Lajpat Hindi High School is a school located at Kidderpore, Kolkata, India. This is a Hindi-medium boys' school and is affiliated to the West Bengal Board of Secondary Education for Madhyamik Pariksha (10th Board exams), and to the West Bengal Council of Higher Secondary Education for Higher Secondary Examination (12th Board exams). The school was established in 1951.

See also
Education in India
List of schools in India
Education in West Bengal

References

External links

Boys' schools in India
High schools and secondary schools in Kolkata
Educational institutions established in 1951
1951 establishments in West Bengal